Hellier de Carteret (fl. 1563 – 1578) was the first Seigneur of Sark, reigning from 1563 to 1578. He was the son of Édouard de Carteret, Seigneur of Saint Ouen (d. 1533), and grandson of Philip de Carteret, 8th Seigneur of St Ouen.

It was Hellier's idea and initiative to re-cultivate the deserted island in 1563, and he was rewarded by being granted, by a Letters Patent, the fief in 1565 by Elizabeth I. He was also Seigneur of Saint Ouen in Jersey.

He married his cousin, Margaret de Carteret. She was the widow of Clement Dumaresq and daughter of the bailiff Helier de Carteret, the uncle and namesake to the Seigneur of Sark. Hellier and Margaret's son was Philippe de Carteret I.

References

External links
decarteret.org.uk Person Sheet

Helier de Carteret
People from Sark
People from Saint Ouen, Jersey
16th-century English nobility